Terique David Mohammed (born January 27, 2000) is a Canadian professional soccer player who plays as a left-back for Lexington SC in USL League One.

Club career

Toronto FC
In 2016, Mohammed joined the academy of Major League Soccer side Toronto FC. In 2018, he played for Toronto FC III and Toronto FC II, and on September 27, 2018, he signed professional terms with the latter for the 2019 season.

Mohammed was loaned to Canadian Premier League club FC Edmonton on August 3, 2020. He made his debut for Edmonton on August 15 against Forge FC. He was released by TFC II on December 23, 2020.

Dundalk
Mohammed signed for League of Ireland Premier Division club Dundalk in February 2021 and was sent out on loan to League of Ireland First Division side Athlone Town in order to gain experience. However, before the season would begin, Mohammed was recalled from loan by Dundalk due to concerns over a lack of playing time while at Athlone. However, due to his late recall he is unable to play a competitive fixture for Dundalk until July, although he did play in a friendly for Dundalk against Athlone on April 27, after which he began training with Canadian side Atletico Ottawa. Mohammed was loaned to York United on June 3, 2021. On September 23, York announced that Mohammed's loan had been terminated. Prior to the 2022 season, new Dundalk coach Stephen O'Donnell would announce that Mohammed would not be in Dundalk's plans for the 2022 season.

FC Edmonton
Mohammed returned to FC Edmonton on March 23, 2022.

Lexington
Mohammed signed with USL League One expansion club Lexington SC on January 27, 2023.

International career
Born in Canada, Mohammed is of Guyanese and Trinidadian descent. In April 2017, Mohammed was named to the Canadian U17 side for the 2017 CONCACAF U-17 Championship. In October 2018, he was named to the U20 side for the 2018 CONCACAF U-20 Championship. Mohammed was named to the Canadian U-23 provisional roster for the 2020 CONCACAF Men's Olympic Qualifying Championship on February 26, 2020.

Career statistics

References

External links
 
 
 

2000 births
Living people
Association football defenders
Soccer players from Toronto
Canadian soccer players
Canadian Premier League players
Canadian people of Trinidad and Tobago descent
Canadian people of Guyanese descent
Canadian expatriate soccer players
Expatriate association footballers in the Republic of Ireland
Canadian expatriate sportspeople in Ireland
Unionville Milliken SC players
Toronto FC players
Toronto FC II players
FC Edmonton players
Dundalk F.C. players
Athlone Town A.F.C. players
York United FC players
Lexington SC players
League1 Ontario players
USL Championship players
USL League One players
Canada men's youth international soccer players
Canadian expatriate sportspeople in the United States
Expatriate soccer players in the United States